Inape balzapamba is a species of moth of the family Tortricidae. It is found in Bolívar Province, Ecuador.

The ground colour of the forewings is brownish cream with brown suffusions and strigulation (fine streaks). The hindwings are brownish, but darker on the periphery and whiter basally. The strigulation is brownish.

Etymology
The species name refers to, Balzapamba, the type locality.

References

Moths described in 2008
Endemic fauna of Ecuador
Moths of South America
balzapamba
Taxa named by Józef Razowski